Andrea Gill may refer to:
 Andrea Gill (politician)
 Andrea Gill (artist)